James Holman (1786–1857) was a British adventurer and author.

James Holman may also refer to:

 James Holman (judge) (born 1947), British judge
 James Sanders Holman (1804–1867), mayor of Houston, Texas
 J. Martin Holman (James Martin Holman, Jr., born 1957), literary translator, professor, puppeteer
 Cliff Holman (James Clifton Holman, Jr., 1929–2008), Birmingham, Alabama, television personality
 James Holman (racing driver), see 2014 Legend SuperCup season